The Prize is a novel written by Irving Wallace in 1962 concerning the annual prize-giving ceremony of the Nobel Prize. A film, based on the book and starring Paul Newman, was made later in 1963.
Six people all around the world are catapulted to international fame as they receive the most important telegraph of their lives, which invites them to Stockholm to receive the prize. This will be a turning point in their lives, in which personal affairs and political intrigue will engulf every one of the characters.

1962 American novels
Novels set in Stockholm
Nobel Prize
Novels by Irving Wallace
American novels adapted into films
Simon & Schuster books